Gerdakan Dar or Gerda Kandar may refer to:
 Gerdakan Dar-e Olya
 Gerdakan Dar-e Sofla